The 1990 New Hampshire Wildcats football team was an American football team that represented the University of New Hampshire as a member of the Yankee Conference during the 1990 NCAA Division I-AA football season. In its 19th year under head coach Bill Bowes, the team compiled a 7–3–1 record (5–3 against conference opponents) and tied for second place out of nine teams in the Yankee Conference.

Schedule

References

New Hampshire
New Hampshire Wildcats football seasons
New Hampshire Wildcats football